The Empire Life Insurance Company, operating as Empire Life, is a Canadian life insurance and financial services company headquartered in Kingston, Ontario. It was incorporated in 1923 and is a subsidiary of E-L Financial Corporation Limited of Toronto, Ontario, Canada. The company provides individual life, health and investment products as well as group life and health products through independent distribution partners including financial advisors, management general agents, national account firms and employee benefit producers. Empire Life is the parent company of Empire Life Investments Inc., a Canadian investment management company launched in 2011.

Empire Life has grown to become one of the top 10 life insurance companies in Canada and one of Canada's best employers.

History and ownership
Empire Life was founded in 1923 by Milton Palmer Langstaff.

In 1929, Empire Life merged with The Commonwealth Life and Accident Insurance Company. This merger was followed by the acquisition of The Canadian Order of Odd Fellows insurance portfolio in 1934, and a subsequent merger with the Mutual Relief Life Insurance Company in 1936. Following the acquisition of the Mutual Relief Life Insurance Company, the company's head office moved from Toronto, Ontario to Kingston, Ontario.

In 1968, E-L Financial Corporation Limited  acquired 94% of the outstanding shares of Empire Life. In 1987, E-L Financial acquired The Montreal Life Insurance Company, as well as the life insurance operations of The Dominion of Canada General Insurance Company, and adopted the marketing name of Empire Financial Group.

As part of this acquisition, Empire Life became a subsidiary of the holding company, E-L Financial Services Limited which now owns 98.3% of the company. The remaining 1.7% of Empire Life common shares are widely held by various individual shareholders. E-L Financial Services Limited is 100% owned by E-L Financial Corporation Limited.

In 1992, Empire Life acquired a block of group insurance business from the Metropolitan Life Insurance Company, and in 1993 acquired the non-participating individual insurance policies of The Citadel Life Assurance Company. In 1995, Empire Life agreed to administer and assume a block of deferred annuity and Registered Retirement Income Fund (RRIF) policies of Confederation Life Insurance Company. In 1997, Empire Life assumed a block of deferred annuity policies from Allstate Life Insurance Company of Canada. In 2000, Empire Life assumed a block of annuity and RRIF policies from Coopérants, Mutual Life Insurance Society.

On December 31, 1997, Empire Life acquired all the shares of Colonia Life Insurance Company and subsequently changed the name of the company to Concordia Life Insurance Company a year later. On January 1, 2002, Empire Life and Concordia amalgamated as one company under the name of The Empire Life Insurance Company (or L'Empire, Compagnie d'Assurance-Vie). From 1987 to 2005, Empire Life used the marketing name of Empire Financial Group but re-branded as Empire Life in 2006.

Products
Individual Insurance
Term life insurance, Permanent life insurance and Critical illness insurance

Wealth Management
Segregated funds, Portfolio funds, Guaranteed Interest Options (GIOs), Registered Retirement Income Fund including a Guaranteed Minimum Withdrawal Benefit (GMWB) product, Group Registered Retirement Savings Plan, Mutual Funds through Empire Life Investments Inc.

Group Benefits 
Small and medium business group life and health insurance plans, group life and health insurance plans for 20+ employees, Administrative Services Only (ASO) contracts, cost plus arrangements and disability management

Sponsorships and philanthropy
 Empire Life invests in communities across the country through charitable donations, employee volunteer hours, in-kind contributions and community sponsorships.
 Empire Life Invests $250,000 in Pathways to Education's Graduation Nation Initiative

Corporate management
 Mark Sylvia, FCIP, FLMI, president and chief executive officer
 Richard Carty, MBA, general counsel and senior vice-president
 Edward Gibson, FSA, FCIA, senior vice-president and chief actuary
 Paul Holba, CFA, senior vice-president and chief investment officer
 Michael Perry, BA, senior vice-president, group solutions
 Steve Pong, BSc, senior vice-president, retail
 Mark Rogers, CA, senior vice-president, corporate development
 Rebecca Rycroft, FSA, FCIA, senior vice-president and chief financial officer
 Kathy Thompson, FSA, FCIA, senior vice-president and chief risk officer
 Chris Volk, senior vice-president and chief technology officer

Board of directors
 Chairman of the board: Duncan N.R. Jackman 
 Directors: Stephanie Bowman, John F. Brierley, Scott F. Ewert, Mark J. Fuller, Edward Iacobucci, Clive P. Rowe, Mark A. Sylvia, Jacques Tremblay, Patricia M. Volker
 Honorary chairman: The Honourable Henry N. R. Jackman

External links
 Empire Life web site
 E-L Financial Corporation Limited (E-L)
 Empire Life Investments Inc
 Bloomberg Businessweek Companies

References

Companies based in Kingston, Ontario
Companies listed on the Toronto Stock Exchange
Financial services companies established in 1923
Life insurance companies of Canada
1923 establishments in Ontario
Canadian companies established in 1923